Polygala serpyllifolia, the heath milkwort, is a European native perennial of heaths and grassy places.

Description
It grows to a height of 25 cm. The lower leaves are in opposite pairs. It flowers from May to August.

References

Wild Flowers of Britain by Roger Phillips.

serpyllifolia